Nagpur Junction - Shri Chhatrapati Shahu Maharaj Terminus Kolhapur Express is an express train of the Indian Railways connecting Nagpur Junction in Maharashtra and Shri Chhatrapati Shahu Maharaj Terminus of Maharashtra. It is currently being operated with 11403/11404 train numbers on a biweekly basis.

Service

The 11403/Nagpur Junction - Kolhapur Shri Chhatrapati Shahu Maharaj Terminus Express has an average speed of 45 km/hr and covers 1038 km in 23 hrs. 11404/Shri Chhatrapati Shahu Maharaj Terminus Kolhapur - Nagpur Junction Express has an average speed of 44 km/hr and 1038 km in 23 hrs 45 mins.

Route and halts 

The important halts of the train are:

Coach composite

The train has standard ICF rakes with max speed of 110 kmph. The train consists of 22 coaches :

 1 AC II Tier
 2 AC III Tier
 9 Sleeper Coaches
 6 General
 2 Second-class Luggage/parcel van

Traction

Both trains are hauled by a Pune Loco Shed based WDM 3A diesel locomotive from Nagpur to Kolhapur and vice versa.

Schedule

11403 - Leaves Nagpur Jn. every  Tuesday, Saturday at 3:00 PM IST and reach SCSMT Kolhapur on next day(Wednesday, Sunday) at 2:00 PM IST

11404 - leaves SCSMT Kolhapur every Monday, Friday and reach Nagpur Jn. next Day (Tuesday, Saturday) at 12:35 PM IST

Direction Reversal

Train Reverses its direction 4 times:

See also 

 Maharashtra Express

Notes

External links 

 11403/Nagpur-Kolhapur CSMT Express
 11404/CSMT Kolhapur - Nagpur Express

References 

Express trains in India
Rail transport in Maharashtra
Transport in Nagpur
Transport in Kolhapur
Railway services introduced in 2011